TWA Flight 513, registration NC86513, Star of Lisbon, was a Lockheed L-049 Constellation operated by Transcontinental and Western Air on a training flight on July 11, 1946 near Reading, Pennsylvania. Electrical wiring in the baggage compartment arced, starting a fire. The smoke and intense fire created made it impossible for the pilots to maintain control of the aircraft. Of the six crewmembers aboard, five were killed. This accident is memorable for grounding all Lockheed Constellations from July 12 until August 23, 1946 when cargo fire detection equipment could be installed.

See also
 United Airlines Flight 624

References

External links
 
 Report of the Civil Aeronautics Board (Archive)

Airliner accidents and incidents in Pennsylvania
513
Accidents and incidents involving the Lockheed Constellation
Aviation accidents and incidents in the United States in 1946
History of Berks County, Pennsylvania
1946 in Pennsylvania
Airliner accidents and incidents caused by in-flight fires